Andrew Patrick Rose (born 13 February 1990) is an English football coach and former professional player who played as a midfielder. Born in Australia, Rose played for the youth teams of Bristol City in England before moving to the United States and made his professional debut for American Major League Soccer side Seattle Sounders FC in 2012. After retiring from playing, Rose became an assistant coach for the same club in 2022.

Career

Youth and college
Born in Australia to English parents, Rose moved to England at a young age and joined the academy system at Bristol City at the age of 14, going on to represent the club at the U18 level. Although born in Australia and frequently identified as an Australian, Rose is a British citizen and does not hold Australian citizenship.

Rose played college soccer at UCLA between 2008 and 2011. During his time at UCLA, Rose was named All-Pac-10 Conference First Team in both 2010 and 2011. During his time at college, Rose also appeared for USL Premier Development League clubs Seattle Wolves in 2009 and Ventura County Fusion in 2010 and 2011.

Professional
Real Salt Lake selected Rose in the first round (sixth overall) of the 2012 MLS Supplemental Draft, but he was later traded to Seattle Sounders FC in exchange for the rights to Leone Cruz.

On 13 March 2012, the Sounders signed Rose to a professional contract. On 5 May, Rose made his début for the Sounders in a 1–0 home win over the Philadelphia Union. Rose was ranked 24th among MLS players under the age of 24 in 2012, according to MLSSoccer.com.

In December 2015, Rose agreed a deal with Coventry City to join the English club in January 2016, signing a contract until June 2017.

On 13 June 2017, Rose signed an initial one-year contract with Scottish Premiership side Motherwell. On 16 May 2018, Rose signed a new one-year contract with Motherwell.

On 10 December 2018, Vancouver Whitecaps FC acquired the rights to Rose from Seattle in exchange for $50,000 of General Allocation Money. He signed with the club on the same day ahead of their 2019 season, with the transfer due to be completed on 1 January 2019. Rose was left unprotected for the 2022 expansion draft, and the club announced that he had left as of 14 January 2022.

Coaching career

Rose is a UEFA 'A' License and UEFA Elite Youth 'A' License holder and earned a master's degree in sports management from Southern New Hampshire University. He coached the under-17 squad for the Whitecaps FC Academy in 2021 while playing for the senior team. Rose joined Seattle Sounders FC as an assistant coach in January 2022.

Personal life
Rose received his U.S. green card in 2013 which qualifies him as a domestic player for MLS roster purposes.

In 2016, he married Ryan Bradley, the younger daughter of former United States men's national soccer team and current Toronto FC manager Bob Bradley.

In November 2016, at the age of 26, Rose was diagnosed with Type 1 diabetes. Rose and his friend Jordan Morris are the only two athletes playing in MLS with the condition.

Career statistics

References

External links
 
 
 UCLA Bruins bio

1990 births
Living people
English footballers
English expatriate footballers
UCLA Bruins men's soccer players
Washington Crossfire players
Ventura County Fusion players
Seattle Sounders FC players
Coventry City F.C. players
Association football midfielders
Soccer players from Melbourne
Footballers from Bristol
Expatriate soccer players in the United States
Real Salt Lake draft picks
USL League Two players
Major League Soccer players
English Football League players
Motherwell F.C. players
Scottish Professional Football League players
English expatriate sportspeople in the United States
Vancouver Whitecaps FC players
Seattle Sounders FC non-playing staff
Association football coaches